A GE B39-8 is a 4-axle diesel-electric locomotive built by GE Transportation Systems.  It is part of the GE Dash 8 Series of freight locomotives.  Following the production of the first three units for the Atchison, Topeka and Santa Fe Railway, GE made many mechanical and electrical improvements that were reflected in a redesigned carbody for the remainder of production; these later units are sometimes unofficially referred to as B39-8E.

See also
List of GE locomotives

References 

 
 
 

Dash 8-39B
B-B locomotives
Diesel-electric locomotives of the United States
Freight locomotives
Standard gauge locomotives of the United States